The 2015 ANZ Championship season was the eighth season of the ANZ Championship. The season began on 28 February and concluded on 21 June. The 2015 season saw the introduction of several major format changes and initiatives, including a Conference system, a six-team Finals Series, drawn games and a new Ranfurly Shield-style competition, the Challenge Trophy. With a team coached by Roselee Jencke, captained by Laura Geitz and featuring Romelda Aiken, Clare McMeniman and Kim Ravaillion, Queensland Firebirds won the Australian Conference, the Challenge Trophy, the minor premiership and the overall championship. Firebirds narrowly defeated New South Wales Swifts in both the Australian Conference final and the Grand Final on their way to effectively winning four titles.

New format
The 2015 season saw some major format changes. The league introduced separate Australian and New Zealand conferences, a restructured six-team Finals Series and a new competition, the Challenge Trophy. Teams continued to play 13 games – eight home-and-away matches against teams in their own conference and five alternating home or away games against teams in the other conference. The ANZ Championship also introduced draws for the first time. During the regular season, drawn games would see both teams get a point each. Extra time will only be played during the Finals Series. On 15 March, the Round 3 match between New South Wales Swifts and Queensland Firebirds finished 47–47. It was the first official draw in the eight seasons of the league.

Transfers

Head coaches and captains

Summer Shootout
Between 6 and 8 February, New South Wales Swifts hosted the Summer Shootout at Netball Central, Sydney Olympic Park. This was the first major netball tournament to be held at the venue. All ten ANZ Championship teams participated in the three-day tournament. A total of 25 games, consisting of both full length and shortened games consisting of two 15-minute periods, were played over the weekend.

Regular season

Round 1

Round 2

Round 3

Round 4

Round 5

Round 6 Easter Round

Round 7

Round 8

Round 9 ANZAC Round

Round 10

Round 11

Round 12

Round 13

Round 14

Final standings

Challenge Trophy
The 2015 season saw the introduction of the Ranfurly Shield-style, Challenge Trophy. The trophy was available to win every time the holder played at home. Once a visiting team defeats the title holders, the trophy is theirs to protect and hold against all challengers in every home game during the regular season until they are beaten. A pre-season draw saw West Coast Fever declared the inaugural holder and they defended the trophy for first time on 8 March in Round 2 against Northern Mystics. Fever subsequently enjoyed a nine-game unbeaten run in the league. They retained the Challenge Trophy until Round 10 when they were defeated 56–48 by Queensland Firebirds. Firebirds defended the trophy in Round 11 against Melbourne Vixens and in Round 14 against Southern Steel, finishing the season as trophy holders.

Finals series
The new Conference format saw the top three teams from each Conference qualify for the Finals Series. The second and third placed teams from each Conference played off in the Elimination Final. The winner then took on the first placed team in the Conference Final. The four Conference finalists will then progress to the semi-finals where the Conference Champions hosted the runner up of the other conference for a chance to compete in the ANZ Championship Grand Final.

Australian Conference
Elimination Final 

Conference Final

New Zealand Conference 
Elimination Final

Conference Final

Semi-finals

Grand Final

Award winners

ANZ Championship awards

Notes
 Romelda Aiken was the MVP player in the Australian Conference and Jhaniele Fowler-Reid was the MVP player in the New Zealand Conference.

All Star Team

Australian Netball Awards

New Zealand Netball Awards

Statistics

Top scorers

Top rebounds

Media coverage
All 72 games were broadcast live on Fox Sports (Australia). Their commentary team included Liz Ellis, Sharelle McMahon, Catherine Cox and Kelli Underwood. Sunday afternoon's Match Of The Round were also broadcast live on One. Sky Sport (New Zealand) remained as the principal broadcast partner in New Zealand. Māori Television broadcast one full match replay on Te Reo while Prime TV showed highlights.

References

 
2015
2015 in New Zealand netball
2015 in Australian netball